Vernon is a neighborhood in the Northeast section of Portland, Oregon, United States.

Features
 Alberta Park
 The Know (Portland, Oregon)

References

External links
 
Vernon neighborhood bylaws
Vernon Street Tree Inventory Report

 
Neighborhoods in Portland, Oregon